The Harvard–Yenching Classification System is a  library classification system for Chinese language materials in the United States of America. It was devised by Alfred Kaiming Chiu (1898–1977). The system was primarily created for the classification of Chinese language materials in the Harvard–Yenching Library which was founded in 1927 at the Harvard–Yenching Institute.

During that early period other systems, such as the early edition of the Library of Congress Classification, did not consist of appropriate subject headings to classify the Chinese language materials, particularly the ancient published materials.  As many American libraries started to collect the ancient and contemporary published materials from China, a number of American libraries subsequently followed Harvard University to adopt Harvard–Yenching classification system, such as the East Asian Library of the University of California in Berkeley, Columbia University, University of Chicago, Washington University in St. Louis etc.

In addition to American libraries, the libraries of other universities in the world including England, Australia, New Zealand, Hong Kong, Singapore etc. also followed Harvard University to adopt the system.  During the period from the 1930s to the 1970s, the use of the system became popular for classifying not only Chinese language materials but also other East Asian materials including Korean and Japanese language materials.

During the period from the 1970s to the 1980s, a comprehensive subset of subject headings for Chinese language materials was gradually established in the Library of Congress Classification System so that almost a full spectrum of ancient and contemporary Chinese topics can be widely covered. As a result of this, the Library of Congress Classification System eventually replaced the Harvard–Yenching Classification System for all Chinese language materials acquired after the 1970s in many American Libraries.

Though the system has largely been phased out, the system is still being used in some libraries for Chinese language materials acquired prior to the Library of Congress update. Such previously acquired books are normally stored in separate stacks in libraries. However, some of the university libraries in the Commonwealth countries of the United Kingdom such as England, Australia and New Zealand still continue to use the Harvard–Yenching system; for example, the Institute for Chinese Studies Library of the University of Oxford, University of Sydney, and University of Auckland.

The Harvard–Yenching classification system 
The key classes of the system are listed as follows:

Key classes
 0100–0999 Chinese Classics
 1000–1999 Philosophy and Religion
 2000–3999 Historical Sciences
 4000–4999 Social Sciences
 5000–5999 Language and Literature
 6000–6999 Fine and Recreative Arts
 7000–7999 Natural Sciences
 8000–8999 Agriculture and Technology
 9000–9999 Generalia and Bibliography

Subjects of sub-classes

0100 to 0999 Chinese Classics
 0100–0199 Chinese classics in general
 0200–0299 I Ching
 0300–0399 Shu Ching
 0400–0499 Shih Ching
 0500–0669 San Li
 0680–0799 Ch’un Ch’iu
 0800–0849 Hsiao Ching
 0850–0999 Ssu Shu

1000 to 1999 Philosophy and Religion
 1000–1008 Philosophy & religion in general
 1010–1429 Chinese philosophy
 1470–1499 Hindu philosophy
 1500–1539 Occident philosophy
 1540–1569 Philosophical problems and systems
 1570–1609 Logic
 1610–1649 Metaphysics
 1650–1699 Ethics
 1700–1729 Religion in general
 1730–1738 Mythology
 1739–1749 Occultism numerology
 1750–1779 History of religions
 1780–1799 Chinese state cults
 1800–1919 Buddhism
 1920–1939 Taoism
 1975–1987 Christianity
 1988–1999 Other religions

2000 to 3999 Historical Sciences
 2000–2049 Archaeology, Antiquities in general
 2060–2159 China archaeology
 2200–2249 Ethnology, ethnography
 2250–2299 Genealogy and biography
 2300–2349 World history
 2350–2399 World geography
 2400–2440 Asian history and geography
 2450–2459 History of China in general
 2461–2469 Chinese historiography
 2470–2479 History of Chinese civilisation
 2480–2509 Diplomatic history of China
 2510–2519 General China history
 2520–2533 Ancient history of China in general
 2535 Ch’in, Han and 3 Kingdom in general
 2536–2543 Ch’in Dynasty
 2545–2559 Han Dynasty
 2560–2567 The Three Kingdom
 2570 Chin Dynasty and the Southern / Northern Dynasties
 2571–2578 Chin Dynasty (266–420)
 2581–2588 The Southern Dynasties
 2590–2599 The Northern Dynasties
 2605–2618 Sui, T’ang & the Five Dynasties in general
 2605–2619 Sui Dynasty
 2620–2639 T’ang Dynasty
 2640–2649 Epoch of the Five Dynasties (North)
 2650–2660 The Ten Kingdoms (South)
 2662 Sung, Liao, Chin and Yuan Dynasties in general
 2665–2684 Sung Dynasty (960–1279)
 2685–2688 The Liao Kingdom (916–1201)
 2690 The Chin Kingdom (1115–1234)
 2695 The Hsi Hsia Kingdom (982–1227)
 2700–2713 Yuan Dynasty (1280–1268)
 2718 Ming and Ching Dynasties in general
 2720–2739 Ming Dynasty
 2740–2969 Ch’ing Dynasty
 2970 Period of Republic, 1912
 3000–3019 China: geography & history in general
 3020–3031 General system treatises
 3032–3049 Special works of geography: China
 3507–3079 China: local description and travel
 3080–3109 Maps, Atlas of China
 3110–3299 Gazetteers of China
 3300–3479 Japanese history
 3400–3479 Japanese geography
 3480–3489 Korean history
 3490–3499 Hong Kong, Macau history and geography
 3500–3599 Other counties in Asia: history and geography
 3600–3799 Europe: history and geography
 3800–3899 America: history and geography
 3900–3999 Africa, Oceania: history and geography

4000 to 4999 Social Sciences
 4000–4019 Social sciences in general
 4020–4099 Statistics
 4100–4299 Sociology
 4300–4599 Economics
 4600–4899 Politics and Law
 4900–4999 Education

5000 to 5999 Language and Literature
 5000–5039 Linguistics in general
 5040–5059 Literature in general
 5060–5069 Chinese language in general
 5070–5089 Semantic studies
 5090–5119 Graphic studies
 5120–5139 Phonological Studies
 5140–5149 Grammar
 5150–5159 Dialects
 5160–5169 Texts: learning the language
 5170–5199 Lexicography dictionaries
 5200–5209 Chinese literature in general
 5210–5217 Chinese literature: literary criticism
 5218–5229 Chinese literature: history & biography
 5230–5235 Chinese literature: collection of individual complete works
 5236–5241 Chinese literature: general anothlogies
 5242–5569 Collected Chinese literary works of individual authors
 5570–5649 Tz’u
 5650–5730 Lyrical works and drama
 5731–5769 Chinese Fiction
 5770–5779 Letters
 5780–5799 Miscellany: proverbs, fables, juv. lit.
 5800–5809 Minor languages in China
 5810–5859 Japanese language
 5860–5959 Japanese literature
 5973 Korean language and literature
 5975–5993 Indo-European language and literature
 5994–5999 Other language and literature

6000 to 6999 Fine and Recreative Arts
 6000–6019 Fine and recreative arts in general
 6020–6029 Aesthetics
 6030–6069 History of arts
 6070–6289 Chinese & Japanese Calligraphy and painting
 6290–6299 Materials & instruments
 6300–6349 Western painting
 6350–6359 Engraving Prints
 6360–6399 Photography
 6400–6499 Sculpture
 6500–6599 Architecture
 6600–6699 Industrial arts
 6700–6799 Music
 6800–6899 Amusements & games
 6900–6999 Physical training & sports

7000 to 7999 Natural Sciences
 7000–7019 Natural science in general
 7020–7099 Mathematics
 7100–7199 Astronomy
 7200–7299 Physics
 7300–7399 Chemistry
 7400–7499 Geological science
 7500–7599 Natural history
 7600–7699 Botany
 7700–7799 Zoology
 7800–7869 Anthropology (Physical)
 7870–7899 Psychology
 7900–7999 Medical science

8000 to 8999 Agriculture and Technology
 8000–8009 Agriculture & technology in general
 8020–8239 Agriculture
 8240–8289 Home economics (Domestic)
 8290–8299 Technology in general
 8300–8349 Handicrafts & artisan trades
 8400–8499 Manufactures
 8500–8599 Chemical technology
 8600–8699 Mining & Metallurgy
 8700–8899 Engineering
 8900–8999 Military & Naval science

9000 to 9999 Generalia and Bibliography
 9000–9007 Generalia and bibliography in general
 9100 Chinese general series of composite nature
 9101–9109 Chinese general series of a special type
 9110 Chinese series of particular locality
 9111–9120 Chinese family & individual author
 9130–9163 Sinology
 9164–9179 Japanese general series
 9180–9199 Japanese individual polygraphic books
 9200–9229 General periodicals & society publications
 9230–9289 General congresses & museums
 9290–9339 General encyclopedias and reference books
 9401–9409 Bibliography in general
 9410–9510 Bibliography
 9511–9519 Subject bibliographies
 9520–9539 Chinese collective bibliographies
 9540–9549 Other general bibliographies of various countries
 9550–9559 Reading lists & best books, periodical index
 9562–9569 Special bibliographies
 9570–9579 Bibliographies of critical reviews
 9600–9629 Library catalogues
 9630–9639 Dealers’ & publishers’ catalogues
 9640–9684 Japanese bibliographies
 9696–9699 Bibliographies of Western countries
 9700–9929 Librarianship
 9930–9999 Journalism, newspapers

See also 
The official library classification in China is:

 Chinese Library Classification (CLC)

The other library classifications for Chinese materials outside China are:
 Cambridge University Library Chinese Classification System , Classification Scheme for Chinese Books drawn up by Profs. Haloun and P. van der Loon for Cambridge University, UK.
 University of Leeds Classification of Books in Chinese, UK (36 pages of Catalog in pdf)

Notes

References
 Harvard–Yenching Classification in the University of Melbourne – Subject headings in both Chinese and English.
 PDF – Brief history of the Harvard–Yenching Classification System, and an overview of the collections of Chinese language materials in Columbia University, Cornell University, Harvard University, the Library of Congress, Princeton University and Yale University.
 Yenching, The singular history of a singular library, Ken Gewertz, Harvard News Office – A brief history of the Harvard–Yenching Library and the Harvard–Yenching Classification System.

External links 
 Examples of the Harvard–Yenching classification system
 East Asian Library of the University of California in Los Angeles

Library cataloging and classification
Chinese culture
Harvard University
Yenching University